Since 2010, the NCAA has had a joint contract with CBS and Turner Broadcasting. The coverage of the tournament is split between CBS, TNT, TBS, and truTV.

Broadcasters from CBS, TBS, and TNT's sports coverage are shared across all four networks, with CBS' college basketball teams supplemented with Turner's NBA teams, while studio segments take place at the CBS Broadcast Center in New York City and Turner's studios in Atlanta. In the New York-based studio shows, CBS' Greg Gumbel and Clark Kellogg are joined by Ernie Johnson, Jr., Kenny Smith, and Charles Barkley of TNT's Inside the NBA while Seth Davis of CBS assists with Casey Stern and various NBA TV personalities. While two of Turner's NBA voices, Kevin Harlan and Ian Eagle, are already employed by CBS in other capacities, they also lend analysts Reggie Miller, Chris Webber, Grant Hill, and Steve Smith and secondary play-by-play man Brian Anderson to CBS. In turn, CBS announcers Jim Nantz, Brad Nessler, Spero Dedes, Andrew Catalon, and Carter Blackburn appear on Turner network broadcasts along with analysts Jim Spanarkel, Bill Raftery, and Dan Bonner.

The current contract runs through 2024 and, for the first time in history, provides for the nationwide broadcast each year of all games of the tournament. All First Four games air on truTV. A featured first- or second-round game in each time "window" is broadcast on CBS, while all other games are shown either on TBS, TNT or truTV. The regional semifinals, better known as the Sweet Sixteen, are split between CBS and TBS. CBS had the exclusive rights to the regional finals, also known as the Elite Eight, through 2014. That exclusivity extended to the entire Final Four as well, but after the 2013 tournament Turner Sports elected to exercise a contractual option for 2014 and 2015 giving TBS broadcast rights to the national semifinal matchups. CBS kept its national championship game rights.

Since 2015, CBS and TBS split coverage of the Elite Eight. Since 2016, CBS and TBS alternate coverage of the Final Four and national championship game, with TBS getting the final two rounds in even-numbered years, and CBS getting the games in odd-numbered years. March Madness On Demand would remain unchanged, although Turner was allowed to develop their own service.

Television

Notes

1960s
In 1962, ABC showed the NCAA Championship Game on a one-day delayed basis, as part of Wide World of Sports.
From 1969 to 1972, both the Consolation (3rd place) Game and the Championship Game were televised on Saturday afternoon as a doubleheader. In 1969 and 1970, Curt Gowdy and Jim Simpson reversed roles for the telecast; Gowdy called the title game and Simpson earlier called the "consy." In 1973, the final was moved to Monday night, and the consy was no longer televised. In 1982, the consy game was dropped altogether.
Prior to 1969, the NCAA Championship was never on live network television. However, the one-time rival NIT tourney had been on CBS for many years in the 1960s and well into the 1970s. Before the NCAA allowed conferences to receive multiple bids in 1975, the NIT fielded some high-quality tournaments.

1970s
In 1976, Dick Enberg and Billy Packer called the first game while Packer teamed with Curt Gowdy for the second game. For the Championship Game, Dick Enberg and Curt Gowdy called it while NBC used Billy Packer as a studio analyst.
The 1979 championship game between Larry Bird's Indiana State Sycamores and Magic Johnson's Michigan State Spartans to this day, remains the highest-rated game in the history of televised college basketball.

1980s
1982 marked the first year that the Selection Show was broadcast.
1987 marked the first year that CBS used the song "One Shining Moment" for its tournament epilogue.
In 1989, Lesley Visser became the first woman to cover the Final Four.

1990s
The 1990 Championship Game marked Brent Musburger's final assignment for CBS Sports as he was dismissed (under great controversy) just a day earlier (April 1).
CBS did not use a sideline reporter for the 1994 Championship Game.

2000s
In 2008, CBS' studio team did not travel to the Final Four site. Instead, Greg Gumbel, Clark Kellogg and Seth Davis remained at the CBS Broadcast Center in New York City.
Clark Kellogg replaced Billy Packer as CBS' lead basketball color commentator for the 2008–2009 college basketball season and called the 2009 NCAA Final Four.

2010s
Despite CBS' contract to carry the tournament until 2013, the NCAA had the option of ending the agreement after the 2010 championship. This led to speculation that ESPN would snag the rights to future tournament games. However, on April 22, 2010, the NCAA signed a 14-year agreement with CBS and Turner Broadcasting System worth more than $10.8 billion, allowing CBS to continue airing the entire regional finals through the national championship, with CBS and Turner splitting coverage of earlier rounds in the now 68-team field. After 2015, the regional finals will be shared and the Final Four and National Championship alternating between CBS and TBS.

2020s
There was no coverage in 2020, due to the NCAA cancelling that year's tournament due to concerns about the coronavirus pandemic.

 Expected announcer, subject to change.

See also
NCAA Men's Division I Basketball Championship#Television
Men's college basketball on television

Radio

National

See also
List of NCAA Women's Final Four broadcasters

References

Men's Final Four broadcasters
CBS Sports
CBS Radio Sports
Basketball on NBC
Broadcasters
Wide World of Sports (American TV series)
Hughes Television Network
Turner Sports